NKIA is an enterprise software vendor based in Seongnam, South Korea and headed by CEO Seon-Woo Lee. The company develops various kinds of operations management systems and additionally provides consulting system management and training services. It is a leading provider of homegrown ITSM solutions to the South Korean market. It was founded in 1999, with subsidiaries later formed in Singapore and Malaysia and an office in Beijing.

Revenue
Revenue exceeded 10 billion South Korean Won in 2011, about 10% of which was earned outside of South Korea.

Clients

South Korean Government
NKIA is a major vendor of systems management solutions for domestic e-government projects. The South Korean Government's consistent ranking at the top of the United Nations' E-Government Readiness Index has been attributed in part to their use of NKIA software products. The National Computing and Information Agency's integrated operations management system was developed on the basis of three NKIA software products: Polestar ITSM, Polestar SMS, and Polestar XEUS.

Other public-sector clients in South Korea include the Ministry of Information and Communication, the Korea Deposit Insurance Corporation, the Ministry of Education & Human Resources Development, and the Ministry of Education, Science and Technology, who used NKIA software for the National Education Information System.

Other Clients
Other clients include Sun Microsystems, Asia Commercial Bank, LG Group, Malaysia Airports Technologies,  KTX,  Mobifone, Korea Telecom, and SK Telecom.

Products

Monitoring
 Polestar SMS : This is systems management software. NKIA and Tibero signed an agreement in 2011 to certify interoperability between Polestar SMS and Tibero RDBMS and to work together to ensure intercompatibility of future products.
 Polestar VM SMS 
 Polestar NMS 
 Polestar STM 
 Polestar DPM 
 Polestar WPM 
 Polestar APM 
 Polestar SOC EMS

Operations Management
 Polestar ITSM 
 Polestar ITAM: An IT asset management product
 Polestar Automation Suite 
 Polestar XEUS: Provides a web-based cloud operations management solution to automate all IaaS (Infrastructure as a Service) administration tasks, including accounting, resource allocation, and real-time monitoring. It was released on September 7, 2011.
 Polestar TAMS

Governance
 Polestar Big Data Suite 
 Polestar Enterprise Dashboard

References

External links 
 NKIA Website

1999 establishments in South Korea
Software companies established in 1999
Seongnam
Software companies of South Korea